Sex Ed the Series is an American comedy web series created, written and produced by Ernie Vecchione and co-produced and directed by Tamela D'Amico.

The show revolves around the lives of eight students and their manic professor, Alison Trevase (Joanna Cassidy). The show is described as a cross between The Breakfast Club and Sex and the City.  The show stars Matt Barr, Angela Sarafyan, George Finn, Laura Clery, Andrea Lui, Annie Abrams, Andra Fuller, Casey Graf, Bo Barrett, Tamela D'Amico, Jennifer Johnson, Louis Morabito and Stevie Ryan.

Plot summary
Eight college students get more than they bargained for when their professor forces the students to pair up and make clay sculptures of each other's genitals.

History
The pilot was a selection of the 2009 Independent Television Festival. The show was first broadcast as a web series by KoldCastTV in 2010.

Nominations
The show received a Streamy nomination for Best Actress in a Comedy for Joanna Cassidy and a Webby nomination for Best Drama.

In the May 3, 2010 issue of TV Guide magazine, the series was selected as What's Worth Watching by Damian Holbrook.

Episodes

Website and YouTube
Its YouTube channel, as of November 2019, surpassed nearly 150 million channel views worldwide, with over 54 million views for its half-hour premiere episode. The official web site was relaunched on Aug 1, 2012 with twenty minutes of additional material.

References 

Sex Ed: The Series, Winner, Webby Award
Sex Ed: The Series, winner 2010 Streamy Awards.

External links

 on KoldCast TV

2009 web series debuts
2010 web series endings
American comedy web series
American drama web series
Television shows filmed in Los Angeles